Trévérien is a commune in the Ille-et-Vilaine department of Brittany in northwestern France.

Population
Inhabitants of Trévérien are called Trévérienais in French.

Personalities
 Henri Pinault, Roman Catholic Bishop of Chengdu, born in Trévérien in 1904

See also
Communes of the Ille-et-Vilaine department

References

External links

Mayors of Ille-et-Vilaine Association 

Communes of Ille-et-Vilaine